Janusz Gerard Pyciak-Peciak (born 9 February 1949) is a Polish modern pentathlete, Olympic champion and several times world champion.

Olympics
Pyciak-Peciak competed at the 1972 Summer Olympics. Four years later at the 1976 Summer Olympics in Montreal, he won an individual gold medal. He finished 6th at the 1980 Summer Olympics, and the Polish team finished 4th.

World championships
Pyciak-Peciak became individual world champion in 1977 and in 1981, and received silver medals in 1978 and 1979. He won the title three times with the Polish team, in 1977, 1978 and 1981.

Awards
Pyciak-Peciak was elected Polish Sportspersonality of the Year 1977, and again in 1981.

References

1949 births
Living people
Polish male modern pentathletes
Olympic modern pentathletes of Poland
Modern pentathletes at the 1972 Summer Olympics
Modern pentathletes at the 1976 Summer Olympics
Modern pentathletes at the 1980 Summer Olympics
Olympic gold medalists for Poland
Sportspeople from Warsaw
Olympic medalists in modern pentathlon
Medalists at the 1976 Summer Olympics